Robert Raikes (1736–1811) was an English pioneer of Sunday schools, Gloucester newspaper publisher, and philanthropist.

Robert Raikes may also refer to:

 Robert Raikes (1683–1753), British Member of Parliament for Northallerton
 Robert Raikes the Elder (1690–1757), English printer and newspaper publisher
 Robert Raikes (1765–1837), British banker and builder of a notable mausoleum
 Robert Raikes (1818–1901), established a tractarian church at Treberfydd
 Robert Raikes (Royal Navy officer) (1885–1953), British admiral
 Robert Napier Raikes (1813–1909), British Indian Army officer

Other
Robert Raikes' House, a 16th-century timber-framed town house in Gloucester